The United States Range is one of the northernmost mountain ranges of the Arctic Cordillera and in the world, surpassed only by the Challenger Mountains to the northwest. The range is located in the northeastern region of Ellesmere Island in Nunavut, Canada, and is part of the Innuitian Mountains. The British Empire Range is immediately to the west of the United States Range.

The range was named in 1861 by American explorer Isaac Israel Hayes after his ship.

See also
List of mountain ranges

References

Further reading
 USDA Forest Service, Eastern Region, Species Conservation Assessment For Juncus stygius var. americanus Buchenau (Moor rush, bog rush), P 12
  Lyle Dick, Muskox Land: Ellesmere Island in the Age of Contact, PP 12 – 14

External links
 Topographic map of the range
 peakbagger
 summitsearch

 
Arctic Cordillera
Mountain ranges of Qikiqtaaluk Region